Guy Martyn Thorold Huchet de la Bédoyère  (born November 1957) is a British historian who has published widely on Roman Britain and other subjects; and has appeared regularly on the Channel 4 archaeological television series Time Team, starting in 1998.

Family background
Despite his French surname, de la Bédoyère's father's ancestry is mostly English, Anglo-Irish and Scottish, with a large part belonging to the ancient Lincolnshire family of Thorold baronets as well as the dukes of Manchester and the earls of Salisbury. His great-great-grandfather was Anthony Wilson Thorold, Bishop of Winchester. One of his male-line ancestors was the cousin of Charles de la Bédoyère, Napoleon's aide-de-camp at Waterloo in 1815. His grandfather, Michael de la Bédoyère, was the editor of the Catholic Herald for approximately thirty years.

Through his mother's side, de la Bédoyère is a cousin of the actress Jessica Raine, the footballer Richard Gough, and the artist Julie Gough, sharing common descent from David Storrar Gough (1885-1957).

Life
Guy de la Bédoyère was born in Wimbledon on 27 November 1957, the eldest of five children. He was educated at King's College School, Wimbledon, and Wimbledon College. He took an archaeology and history degree at Collingwood College, Durham, in 1980, part of Durham University, with a subsidiary paper in Egyptology, a degree in modern history at the University of London in 1985, and an MA in archaeology at the Institute of Archaeology, now part of University College London, in 1987. From 1981 to 1998 he worked for most of the time as a sound engineer for BBC Radio News at Bush House and Broadcasting House in London. In 1998 he became a full-time freelance writer and broadcaster.

His special interests, apart from the Roman Empire and Roman Britain, include coinage (ancient and modern), and the writings of Samuel Pepys and John Evelyn. He is a Fellow of the Royal Numismatic Society, a Fellow of the Society of Antiquaries of London, and a Fellow of the Historical Association. In 1997 he discovered that the rebel Romano-British emperor called Carausius (AD 286–293) had placed explicit reference to lines from poetry by the poet Virgil on his coins, considered a major discovery in the history of the period.

Between 2007 and 2016 de la Bédoyère gave up his full-time freelance work as a writer and broadcaster, to teach at Kesteven and Sleaford High School in Sleaford, Lincolnshire. After training on the Graduate Teacher Programme, he specialised in teaching Modern History and Classical Civilisation.

Television appearances
Guy de la Bédoyère made regular appearances on Channel 4 archaeological television series Time Team as a historian, usually for episodes relating to Roman or military archaeology.

In 1999 de la Bédoyère presented a three-part series called The Romans in Britain for BBC2, produced by the Open University. In 2002 he presented Rebuilding The Past which was broadcast on the Discovery Channel in 2003 and was narrated by Terry Jones. The programme detailed the building of a Roman villa for the first time in 1600 years in Britain – Butser Ancient Farm at Chalton, Hampshire. He left the show before the completion of the project because of a number of issues with the build. He has also taken part in a number of other television programmes including a live archaeology programme from Egypt in 2004 and a live programme from Pompeii in 2006 for Channel 5; a 2006 series on genealogy called My Famous Family, which he co-presented with Bill Oddie for UKTV History; and occasional appearances on Richard & Judy.

Works
de la Bédoyère has published books on a diverse range of subjects.  These include: 
a number of publications on Roman history for English Heritage; 
a book on the archaeology of aviation of the Second World War (for which he took a private pilot's licence at Biggin Hill); 
an edition of the correspondence between the diarists Samuel Pepys and John Evelyn; 
an edition of Samuel Pepys's other letters; 
The Home Front,
The History of Computers, 
The First Polio Vaccine, World Almanac Library, Milwaukee, Wisconsin, 2006, . 
The Discovery of Penicillin in a series of educational science history books

He occasionally contributes to magazines, usually those concerned with history, archaeology or heritage. More recently, he has written for the Daily Telegraph, primarily concerning himself with the COVID-19 pandemic.

Selected works:
 Particular Friends: The Correspondence of Samuel Pepys and John Evelyn, Boydell (2nd edition 2005). .
 The Diary of John Evelyn, Boydell, Woodbridge, 1995. 
 The Letters of Samuel Pepys, Boydell, Woodbridge, 2006. .
 The Finds of Roman Britain, Batsford, London 1988. .
 The Buildings of Roman Britain, Batsford, London 1991, now reprinted by Tempus, Stroud, 2001 as a revised second edition. .
 A Companion to Roman Britain, Tempus, Stroud, 1999. .
 Eagles over Britannia: The Roman Army in Britain, Tempus, Stroud, 2001. .
 Roman Towns in Britain, Tempus, 2003. .
 Architecture in Roman Britain, Shire Archaeology no. 66, 2002. .
 Roman Britain: A New History, Thames & Hudson, 2006. .
 Cities of Roman Italy, Bristol Classical Press, 2010. .
 Real Lives of Roman Britain, Yale University Press, 2015. .
 Praetorian: The Rise and Fall of Rome's Imperial Bodyguard, Yale University Press, 2017. .
 Domina: The Women who Made Imperial Rome, Yale University Press, 2018. .
 Gladius: Living, Fighting and Dying in the Roman Army, Little, Brown Book Group, 2020. .
 Pharaohs of the Sun: How Egypt's Despots and Dreamers Drove the Rise and Fall of Tutankhamun's Dynasty, Little, Brown Book Group, 2022. .

See also
Michael de la Bédoyère
Anthony Wilson Thorold
List of Durham University people

References

Sources
Guy de la Bédoyère's Youtube Channel Classical Civilization
Time Team biography
Debrett's People of Today
Duckworth Academic and Bristol Classical Press author page
Thames & Hudson author page

Alumni of Collingwood College, Durham
Alumni of the UCL Institute of Archaeology
Living people
Fellows of the Society of Antiquaries of London
1957 births
Time Team
Historians of Roman Britain